In game theory, a bimatrix game is a simultaneous game for two players in which each player has a finite number of possible actions. The name comes from the fact that the normal form of such a game can be described by two matrices - matrix  describing the payoffs of player 1 and matrix  describing the payoffs of player 2.

Player 1 is often called the "row player" and player 2 the "column player". If player 1 has  possible actions and player 2 has  possible actions, then each of the two matrices has  rows by  columns.

The players can also play mixed strategies. A mixed strategy for the row player is a non-negative vector  of length  such that: . Similarly, a mixed strategy for the column player is a non-negative vector  of length  such that: .

Nash equilibrium in bimatrix games 
Every bimatrix game has a Nash equilibrium in (possibly) mixed strategies. Finding such a Nash equilibrium is a special case of the Linear complementarity problem and can be done in finite time by the Lemke–Howson algorithm.

There is a reduction from the problem of finding a Nash equilibrium in a bimatrix game to the problem of finding a competitive equilibrium in an economy with Leontief utilities.

Related terms 

References 

Game theory game classes